A referendum on remaining an independent nation was held in Moldova on 6 March 1994. Initiated by President Mircea Snegur, it was referred to as a "Consultation with the people", and was approved by 97.9% of voters.

Question

Legality issues
The referendum was organized by a specially created republican commission after the Central Elections Commission refused to become involved. However, its organization was in contravention of the 1992 referendums law, which stated that a referendum commission should have been formed by Parliament 60 days before the referendum, and no referendums should be held 90 days either side of elections (the parliamentary elections had been held a week earlier).

Results

Aftermath
Many public figures and much of the press presented the referendum as a strong blow to the movement for unification of Romania and Moldova in both countries, despite the fact that the question did not refer directly to Romania, but to independence. It also referred to territorial integrity, which was a main preoccupation due to the Transnistria conflict.

References

Moldova
Political history of Moldova
Referendums in Moldova
Moldova
1994 in Moldova